Battle of Rome may refer to:
 Battle of Rome, a 537 battle during the Siege of Rome
 Arab raid against Rome (846)
 Capture of Rome, an 1870 battle with the Kingdom of Sardinia
 German occupation of Rome, a battle in September 1943 between German and Italian forces after the Italian Armistice of Cassibile with the Allies.  
 Liberation of Rome or the Battle of Rome, a 1944 battle during WWII
 Battle of Monte Cassino or Battle of Rome

See also

 Battle for Rome (disambiguation)
 Battle of Rome Cross Roads, an 1864 battle of the American Civil War in Gordon County, Georgia
 Fall of Rome (disambiguation)
 List of Roman battles
 List of Roman civil wars and revolts
 Sack of Rome (disambiguation)
 Siege of Rome (disambiguation)